The Curtiss Model 36 XNBS-4 was a 1920s prototype biplane night bomber built by the Curtiss Aeroplane and Motor Company for the United States Army Air Corps.

Development 
The XNBS-4 was developed by Curtiss as an improvement on the Martin NBS-1. Two prototypes, AS68571 and AS68572, were built. The design did not enter production because it offered no significant improvement over the NBS-1.

Specifications

References

XNBS-4
1920s United States bomber aircraft
Biplanes
Aircraft first flown in 1924
Twin piston-engined tractor aircraft